Javier Calle Estrada (born 29 April 1991) is a Colombian footballer who currently plays as a midfielder for Bolivian club Club Destroyers.

Club career
Calle began his career with the youth team Independiente Medellín, before graduating to the senior squad in 2009. Calle had a loan spell with América de Cali in 2012 and a further loan spell with Jaguares de Córdoba in 2013. He had his best season with Medellin in 2014 as he scored six goals in 21 league appearances to help his club make the final, which they lost against Santa Fe.

Calle was loaned to MLS club New York City FC on February 6, 2015 for the entirety of the 2015 MLS season. On July 26, against Orlando City SC, he scored his first goal of the season in their 5–3 victory.

International career 
Calle played five matches for the Colombia national u-20 team that reached the quarter-finals at the 2011 FIFA U-20 World Cup.

References

External links

1991 births
Living people
Colombian footballers
Footballers from Medellín
Colombian expatriate footballers
Colombia under-20 international footballers
América de Cali footballers
Independiente Medellín footballers
Jaguares de Córdoba footballers
New York City FC players
Montevideo City Torque players
Club Destroyers players
Categoría Primera A players
Categoría Primera B players
Major League Soccer players
Uruguayan Segunda División players
Bolivian Primera División players
Colombian expatriate sportspeople in the United States
Colombian expatriate sportspeople in Uruguay
Colombian expatriate sportspeople in Bolivia
Expatriate soccer players in the United States
Expatriate footballers in Uruguay
Expatriate footballers in Bolivia
Association football midfielders